Yannick Jankovits (born 6 January 1987) is a French tennis player.

Jankovits has a career high ATP singles ranking of 226 achieved on 14 September 2014. He also has a career high ATP doubles ranking of 303 achieved on 21 September 2014.

He won his first ATP Challenger Tour title on 18 June 2016 in Fergana.

Since the 05/08/2022 he is world champion in the +35 years old category

ATP Challenger Tour and ITF Futures finals

Singles: 29 (15–14)

Doubles: 36 (20–16)

References

External links
 
 

1987 births
Living people
French male tennis players
21st-century French people